Benjamin C. Tollefsen (June 14, 1927 – December 16, 2021) was an American politician in the state of North Dakota. He was a member of the North Dakota House of Representatives from 1985 to 2000, and the North Dakota Senate from 2001 to 2008.

He died in Minot, North Dakota, on December 16, 2021, at the age of 94.

References

1927 births
2021 deaths
People from Minot, North Dakota
Minot State University alumni
Republican Party members of the North Dakota House of Representatives
Republican Party North Dakota state senators